Spirit Cool popularly known as Spirit is a Canadian singer, songwriter, guitarist and acoustic live looping artist based in Vancouver, British Columbia. He is a former Guinness World Recordholder for longest marathon guitar playing.

He was placed in the "Top 20 Lower Mainland Best New Acts" in the 2013 CBC Music's Searchlight Contest, selected by public vote.

Career 
In the 1990s, he played in Poetic Justice, a Kitsilano based band. Later, he toured across Canada, the United States, the United Kingdom and Japan. He has performed with members from Trooper, Prism, Poetic Justice and other bands. He left his construction job to pursue his career in music in 2011, reportedly by Surrey Now.

In 2013, he released his debut album, All The Pieces, which was well received. He uses an acoustic live looping technique to perform original music with an acoustic guitar and his voice. Spirit released singles, Where, Oh Where in November 2017, followed by Give It All Back and Hands.

Spirit was placed in the "Top 20 Lower Mainland Best New Acts" in the 2013 CBC Music's Searchlight competition.

World record 
In May 2018, he entered in the Guinness Book of World's Records for longest marathon guitar playing. He played the guitar for 124.5 hours over six days, breaking the world record of 114 hours of guitar playing, which was previously held by David Browne from Ireland. Later in July 2018, Australian's Scott Burford broke Spirit's record by playing continuous guitar for over 125 hours.

Philanthropy 
In May 2018, he raised $10,000 funds for the Canadian Cancer Society by performing at the River Rock Casino Resort in memory of his parents, who both died of cancer.

Discography

Albums list

See also 

 List of Canadian musicians

References

External links 
 
 Spirit Cool at Spotify
 Spirit Cool "Live Looping Artist" at BlogTalkRadio

1976 births
21st-century Canadian male singers
Living people
Musicians from Vancouver
21st-century Canadian guitarists